Louise Mandell, QC, is a Canadian lawyer and the chancellor of Vancouver Island University. Born in Toronto, Ontario, she is an advocate of Aboriginal rights since 1977, and was a founder of Mandell Pinder law firm, which was established in 1983. She was appointed Queens Counsel in 1997, and in 2001 was awarded the Georges Goyer QC Memorial Award for her work with Indigenous peoples. Of particular note is her work with the Union of British Columbia Indian Chiefs. Hired by George Manuel along with Leslie Pinder, Mandell became a researcher and lawyer for the Union c 1977 and rapidly became an effective judicial advocate, winning many cases that advanced Indigenous rights.

References 

Living people
Canadian women lawyers
Lawyers in British Columbia
People from Toronto
Academic staff of Vancouver Island University
Year of birth missing (living people)